McMurtrie is a surname. Notable people with the surname include:

Charles McMurtrie (1880–1951), pioneer Australian rugby union and rugby league footballer who represented his country at both sports
David McMurtrie Gregg (1833–1916), farmer, diplomat, and a Union cavalry general in the American Civil War
Douglas Crawford McMurtrie (1888–1944), American typeface designer, graphic designer and historian and bibliographer of printing
G. McMurtrie Godley (1917–1999), American diplomat and United States Ambassador to Laos 1969–1973, at the height of the Vietnam War
John McMurtrie (born 1969), British music photographer
Mary McMurtrie, Scottish botanical artist and horticulturalist
William McMurtrie (1851–1913) Chief Government Chemist